William Thomas Lockhart (November 29, 1839 – June 4, 1900) was an Ontario merchant and political figure. He represented Durham West in the Legislative Assembly of Ontario as a Liberal member from 1890 to 1894.

Biography
He was born in Smith Township, Peterborough County, Upper Canada in 1839 and educated in Oshawa. In 1880, he married Mary Renwick. Lockhart was a grain dealer in Newcastle. He served in the local militia. Lockhart was defeated in his bid for reelection in 1894. He died at Bowmanville in 1900 after a brief illness.

References

External links
The Canadian parliamentary companion, 1891 JA Gemmill

1839 births
1900 deaths
Ontario Liberal Party MPPs